Benjamin Marie Petit (April 8, 1811 – February 10, 1839) was a Catholic missionary to the Potawatomi at Twin Lakes, Indiana,
where he served from November 1837 to September 1838. A native of Rennes in Brittany, France, Petit was trained as a lawyer at the University of Rennes, but left the profession after three years to enter the Saint-Sulpice Seminary in Paris to study for the priesthood. In 1836 he decided to move to the United States to become a missionary among the Native Americans. He traveled to New York with a group led by Bishop Simon Bruté, the first bishop of the Catholic Diocese of Vincennes. Petit was sent to Vincennes, Indiana, where Bishop Bruté ordained him as a Roman Catholic priest on October 14, 1837. Within a month the bishop sent the newly ordained priest to work among the Potawatomi in northern Indiana.

Father Petit was known for his compassion toward his Potawatomi parishioners. He also joined them on their forced march to new reservation lands along the Osage River, at the present-day site of Osawatomie, Kansas, in 1838. During his return trip to Indiana in 1839, Father Petit became too ill to continue and died at the Jesuit seminary in St. Louis (present-day Saint Louis University) at the age of 27 years, 10 months. His remains are buried under the Log Chapel at the University of Notre Dame. A Potawatomi Trail of Death marker in honor of Father Petit at St. Philippine Duchesne Park in Linn County, Kansas, was dedicated on September 28, 2003. His experiences and observations of his missionary work among the Potawatomi and their march to Kansas survive in the numerous letters he wrote to family, friends, and colleagues.

Early life and education
Benjamin Marie Petit, the son of Mr. and Mrs. Chauvin Petit, was born on April 8, 1811, at Rennes, in Brittany, France. Petit graduated from the University of Rennes in 1829, and from its law school in 1832. After practicing law for three years, he left the profession to enter the Seminary of Saint Sulpice in Paris, France, to begin studies for the priesthood. By April 1836 Petit had decided to pursue missionary work in the United States. Bishop Simon Bruté, the first bishop of the Catholic Diocese of Vincennes, Indiana, who was visiting France around the same time, may have encouraged Petit to become a missionary among the Native Americans in Indiana. Petit sailed for New York City in June 1836 as part of a group traveling with Bishop Bruté, and arrived on July 21, 1836. Petit was sent to Vincennes, where he received his minor orders on December 16, 1836, and was made a deacon of the Catholic Church on September 23, 1837. Bishop Bruté ordained Petit as a Roman Catholic priest on October 14, 1837, at Vincennes.

Missionary work

Twin Lakes mission
In October 1837 Bishop Bruté sent the newly ordained priest to the Catholic mission at Twin Lakes, Indiana, as a replacement for Father Louis Deseille, who died on September 26, 1837, while serving as a missionary among the Potawatomi in northern Indiana. Father Petit arrived at the mission on November 3, 1837. He became known among the Potawatomi as "Chichipe Outipe", meaning "Little Duck". Having been trained and law and practiced as attorney in France, Petit tried to help the Potawatomi to draft a legal appeal against removal, but to no avail. Within a few months of his arrival, Father Petit had resigned himself to the Potawatomi's impending removal to reservation lands set aside for them west of the Mississippi River. In July 1838 he reported to Bishop Bruté that the Potawatomi's efforts to resist removal from Indiana had failed, and declared "the land is lost, and without recourse, I believe."

Father Petit was known for his compassion and enthusiasm toward his Potawatomi parishioners. He sincerely lamented the Potawatomi's removal from Indiana and the closure of the Catholic mission at Twin Lakes. As he explained in a letter dated September 14, 1838, to his family, "It is sad, I assure you, for a missionary to see a young and vigorous work expire in his arms." He also described his anguish during the mission's final hours: "At the moment of my departure I assembled all my children to speak to them for the last time. I wept and my auditors sobbed aloud; it was indeed a heartrending sight, and over our dying mission we prayed for the success of those they would establish in their new hunting grounds."

Potawatomi Trail of Death 
On August 29, 1838, General John Tipton and a local militia made a surprise visit to the Potawatomi village at Twin Lakes, near Plymouth, Indiana, and in the ensuing days completed preparations for the Potawatomi's forced removal to reservation lands on the banks of the Osage River, at the present-day site of Osawatomie, Kansas. On September 4, General Tipton gave the order to begin the two-month march, which later became known as the Potawatomi Trail of Death. Father Petit was willing to join his Potawatomi parishioners on their journey, "at least until I can place them in the hands of another pastor," but Bishop Bruté initially declined his permission. The Potawatomi began their march to the Kansas territory without Father Petit; however, the bishop soon changed his mind. On September 7, three days after the Potawatomi's departure from Twin Lakes, Father Petit formally accepted General Tipton's invitation to join the caravan.

Father Petit caught up with the caravan at Danville, Illinois, on September 16, 1838, and accompanied the Potawatomi on the remainder of their journey. Father Petit described his arrival at the encampment on Sunday, September 16: "I came in sight of my Christians, under a burning noonday sun, amidst clouds of dust, marching in a line, surrounded by soldiers who were hurrying their steps.... Nearly all the children, weakened by the heat, had fallen into a state of complete languor and depression. I baptized several who were newly born – happy Christians, who with their first step passed from earthly exile to the heavenly sojourn." Tipton commented in a letter dated September 18, 1838, that Father Petit "has, both by example and precept, produced a very favorable change in the morals and industry of the Indians; that his untiring zeal in the cause of civilization has been, and will continue to be, eventually beneficial to those unfortunate Pottawatomies when they reach their new abode."

Of the 859 Potawatomi who began the journey, 756 survived, 42 died, and others escaped. The caravan included 286 horses, 26 wagons, and an armed escort of one hundred soldiers. During the journey Father Petit conducted mass, blessed the graves of the dead, and baptized the dying children, including newborns. He also ministered to the sick and assisted the attending physicians as an interpreter. Father Petit became severely ill with high fever, and suffered from exhaustion and weakness, as did many of the Potawatomi. They also suffered from eye inflammation due to the sun, dust, and windy conditions on the trail. He later reported that the conditions began to improve when the caravan arrived in Missouri, especially after the Potawatomi were allowed to hunt for wild game to supplement their diet.

Upon arrival at their reservation lands along the Osage River on November 4, 1838, the Potawatomi were placed under the supervision of the local Indian agent, and Father Petit completed arrangements to transfer his charge to Christian Hoecken, a Jesuit missionary who had worked on the Kickapoo mission. Father Petit, who was severely weakened from the journey, continued to suffer from a serious illness, including fever and exhaustion, and stayed in the area for six weeks to recuperate. On December 23, 1838, Father Petit received a letter from Bishop Bruté that recalled him to Vincennes.

Death
Father Petit and Abraham Burnett (Nan-wesh-mah), a Potawatomi friend, began the return to Indiana on January 2, 1839. After 150 miles of travel on horseback, Father Petit became too ill to continue the ride, and took a stage to Jefferson City, Missouri. Still too weak to ride a horse, Father Petit traveled east in an open wagon in the rain and over bad roads to reach the Jesuit seminary, which became Saint Louis University on January 15, 1839. He arrived exhausted from his strenuous journey and weakened by successive attacks of fever, with many running sores on his body.

Father Petit hoped to recover at St. Louis and return to Indiana, but his condition worsened on February 6. He died at the Jesuit seminary at 9th and Washington Streets in St. Louis on February 10, 1839, at the age of 27 years, 10 months. A mass was held for him in the seminary's chapel on February 12. Upon receipt of the news of Father Petit's death, Bishop Bruté celebrated a solemn requiem in the St. Francis Xavier Cathedral at Vincennes on February 18, 1839, and delivered a touching eulogy on his favorite missionary, who was known as the "Seraphic Benjamin Petit".

Father Petit was initially buried in the old cemetery at 7th Street and St. Charles Avenue in St. Louis. In 1857 Rev. Edward Sorin, C.S.C. brought Father Petit's remains to St. Mary's Lake in Indiana, where he was reinterred in Father Stephen Badin's log chapel, the site of the present-day University of Notre Dame.

Legacy and honors
Father Petit's remains rest in a place of honor under the Log Chapel at the University of Notre Dame. Because of his devoted service to the Potawatomi, Father Petit is remembered by the Catholic Church as a martyr of charity.

A Potawatomi Trail of Death marker in honor of Father Petit was placed at St. Philippine Duchesne Park, the former site of the Potawatomi's Sugar Creek Mission in Linn County, Kansas. The marker includes boulders from Kansas and Missouri and a Trail of Death route map. The memorial was dedicated on Sunday, September 28, 2003.

Father Petit's chalice, which accompanied him on the Trail of Death from Twin Lakes to Kansas, was returned to Bishop Bruté after Father Petit's death. The chalice is displayed at the St. Francis Xavier Cathedral in Vincennes, Indiana.

Notes

References

Further reading
  (historical novel)

External links
 "Trail of Death", Fulton County Historical Society, Rochester, Indiana
 "Father Benjamin Marie Petit", Potawatomi Trail of Death Association 
 "The Spirit of Notre Dame, Notre Dame Legends and Lore: A Sacred Place Filled with Sacred Memories", Dorothy V. Corson, University of Notre Dame, Notre Dame, Indiana
 Benjamin Marie Petit Collection, University of Notre Dame Archives (UDNA), Notre Dame, Indiana
 "The Death of Benjamin Marie Petit…", Indiana Catholic History blog
 "The History of the Catholic Church in Indiana – Indiana Saints", Indiana Catholic History blog
 "Father Benjamin Marie Petit", Culver-Union Township Public Library, Culver, Indiana
 Father Petit Letter, November 13, 1838, Indiana Historical Society, Indianapolis

1811 births
1839 deaths
19th-century French clergy
19th-century Roman Catholic martyrs
French emigrants to the United States
History of Catholicism in Indiana
Native American history of Indiana
Clergy from Rennes
Potawatomi
French Roman Catholic missionaries
Seminary of Saint-Sulpice (France) alumni
University of Notre Dame people
University of Rennes alumni
Religious leaders from Indiana
Roman Catholic missionaries in the United States